Patti Minter is an American politician. She is a Democrat representing the 20th district in the Kentucky House of Representatives.

Education

Minter earned a bachelor's degree in history from the University of Tennessee in 1986, and a PhD in history from the University of Virginia in 1994.

Political career

In 2018, Minter was elected to represent the 20th district in the Kentucky House of Representatives.

Minter filed to run for re-election on November 18, 2019.

Electoral record

References

Democratic Party members of the Kentucky House of Representatives
University of Tennessee alumni
University of Virginia alumni
Year of birth missing (living people)
Living people
21st-century American politicians